Nicola Vasile (born 15 December 1984) is a Romanian former footballer who played as a midfielder.

Honours
Sportul Studențesc București
Divizia B: 2003–04

References

External links
Nicola Vasile at Labtof.ro

1984 births
Living people
Romanian footballers
Association football midfielders
Liga I players
Liga II players
FC Sportul Studențesc București players
Footballers from Bucharest